The Voter Vault is a database of voters in the United States used by the Republican Party. Construction started in the 1990s, and it was first used in 2002. By 2004 it had about 168 million entries.  By around 2019 it had been renamed  GOP Data Center.

The Democratic Party equivalent database is Demzilla.

See also

 Cambridge Analytica
 Catalist
 Civis Analytics
 Data dredging
 Get out the vote
 Herd behaviour
 Right-wing politics
 Predictive analytics
 Psychographic
 Timshel

References

External links
 "GOP Voter Vault shipped overseas" from PC World, 2004
 Time article on Demzilla and Voter Vault, 2004.

Political campaigns
Republican Party (United States)
Databases in the United States
Voter databases